"Hiroshima" is an anti-war song performed by British band Wishful Thinking, written by David Morgan and produced by Lou Reizner, which tells about the atomic bombing of Hiroshima. The track was recorded at the Chappell Recording Studios in London in 1970. It was first released in 1971 as a single from their album of the same name, but achieved commercial success only upon its re-release in 1978, when it peaked at  8 in West Germany, staying on the chart for 44 weeks. It was one of the best-selling singles of 1978 in West Germany.

Track listing
 7-inch single
A. "Hiroshima" – 4:42
B. "She Belongs to the Night" – 2:47

Charts

Weekly charts

Year-end charts

Sandra version

German singer Sandra covered "Hiroshima" and released her version as a single in January 1990, with production by Michael Cretu. Sandra decided to cover the anti-war "Hiroshima" out of her concern about the political unrest happening in countries like Lebanon, China and Romania in the late 1980s. It was the first song recorded for her fourth album Paintings in Yellow and was released as the LP's lead single in February 1990.

Sandra's cover was commercially successful, particularly in Germany and Switzerland, where it reached the top five and remains one of Sandra's highest-charting singles. In Switzerland, it also peaked at No. 11 on the airplay chart. The music video for the song was directed by Roland Willaert. The clip was released on Sandra's VHS video compilation 18 Greatest Hits in 1992 and the 2003 DVD The Complete History.

In 1999, a remix of the song was released on Sandra's compilation My Favourites. The track was remixed again for her 2006 compilation Reflections.

Critical reception
Music & Media wrote, "A slow, moody number that is spoilt by the obviousness of the production but is, in fact, a charming song with a fine melody."

Track listings
 7-inch single
A. "Hiroshima" – 4:11
B. "La vista de luna" – 3:44

 12-inch single
A. "Hiroshima" (extended version) – 6:44
B1. "Hiroshima" (dub mix) – 3:08
B2. "Heaven Can Wait" (US remix) – 7:11

 CD maxi single
 "Hiroshima" (single version) – 4:11
 "Hiroshima" (extended version) – 6:44
 "Hiroshima" (dub mix) – 3:08
 "Heaven Can Wait" (US remix) – 7:11

Charts

Weekly charts

Year-end charts

Other cover versions
 In 1982, East German band Puhdys released a single with a German-language version of the song. The cover appeared on their album Computer-Karriere.
 The song was also covered by German power metal band Freedom Call and included in the special edition of their first live album Live Invasion (2004).

References

External links
 "Hiroshima" by Wishful Thinking at Discogs
 "Hiroshima" by Sandra at Discogs

1970 songs
1971 singles
1990 singles
Anti-war songs
Atlantic Records singles
Japan in non-Japanese culture
Sandra (singer) songs
Song recordings produced by Michael Cretu
Songs about World War II
Songs about nuclear war and weapons
Works about the atomic bombings of Hiroshima and Nagasaki
Songs based on actual events
Songs written by David Scott-Morgan
Virgin Records singles